Andrew Keith Petterson (born 26 September 1969 in Fremantle, Western Australia, Australia) is an Australian former footballer who last played for ECU Joondalup in the Western Australian Premier League. He became the club's Technical Director in 2013 as part of the club's acceptance into National Premier Leagues WA. 
Last time as a Head Goalkeeper Coach at Indonesian Liga 1 Champions Bali United FC after holding a similar position at PSIS Semarang who also play in the Indonesian Liga 1 in 2018.
Was Head Goalkeeper Coach/ Assistant Coach at Ilocos United FC who competed in the Inaugural Season of the Philippine Football League (2017).
Was Perth Glory FC Westfield W League Goalkeeper Coach (2015-2017). 
Inducted into the Western Australian Football Hall of Fame 2016.
Andy holds both his AFF/AFC B Licence and AFC Level 2 GK Licence.

Playing career
Petterson began his career in his native Australia, leaving East Fremantle Tricolore in 1988 to join the Australian Institute of Sport in Canberra. In November 1988 he left Australia to join English side Luton Town. He spent time with Swindon Town and Ipswich Town, where he became the first Western Australian-born player to appear in the newly formed Premier League in a 2–1 win over Nottingham Forest before joining Charlton Athletic in July 1994 for a fee of £85,000.

He was third-choice keeper for most of the 1994–95 and 1995–96 seasons, behind Mike Salmon and American Mike Ammann, spending time on loan with Bradford City, Ipswich Town, Plymouth Argyle and Colchester United. However, with both Salmon and Ammann injured towards the end of the 1995–96 season, Petterson played well enough in the final nine games, conceding only five goals and helping the club to the play off Semi Finals, to earn a new contract. He began the following season as Salmon's deputy, but after his return to the side in January 1997 became first choice, winning the club's player of the year award at the end of the season. The start of the 1997–98 season saw Petterson as Charlton's first choice keeper, but after 26 appearances lost his place to first Salmon and then Sasa Ilic as Charlton Athletic gained promotion to the Premier League via a Wembley play-off final win over Sunderland. Petterson started the 1998-99 Premier League season for Charlton Athletic as deputy to Ilic and made his first appearance as a substitute in a 2–1 loss to Chelsea at Stamford Bridge. He then started the next game as the Addicks defeated West Ham United 4–2 at the Valley. Petterson again returned to the substitute's bench after Ilic was declared fit before he was allowed to join Portsmouth on loan in November 1998 as cover for Alan Knight. Petterson stayed until February, helping Pompey survive relegation in 1999 before returning to an unsuccessful relegation battle for Charlton Athletic as the South London club returned to the Championship after just one season in the top flight.

Petterson signed for Portsmouth on a free transfer in July 1999 as Alan Ball looked to strengthen his squad after the club's take over. Petterson was a regular under Ball, but with the managers dismissal from the club in November he struggled to establish himself at Fratton Park and had loan spells with Wolverhampton Wanderers (February to May 2000) and Torquay United (March to April 2001). Following a calf injury in pre-season, Petterson failed to make the Pompey first team at all in the 2001–02 season, being behind Dave Beasant and Japan National Team GK Yoshi Kawaguchi in the pecking order and was allowed to join West Bromwich Albion on a free transfer in March 2002. At the Hawthorns he was understudy to Russell Hoult, as he had been at Portsmouth, and although failed to make the first team appearance he was part of the Baggies squad who gained promotion to the Premier League after finishing as runners-up in the Championship. He was released at the end of the season., and then joined Championship new boys Brighton & Hove Albion in August 2002. He was released by Brighton in December 2002 and later played in the League of Ireland for Derry City until being released in April 2003.

He moved on to AFC Bournemouth in December 2003 and to Rushden & Diamonds in September 2004 on non-contract terms. However, Petterson joined Southend United a week later, playing just once before a free transfer move to Walsall in January 2004.

On his Walsall debut Petterson conceded six goals, and went on to play a further two games. Walsall were relegated at the end of the season, and Petterson was subsequently released in May 2004.

Petterson joined Notts County on a short-term deal in December 2004, but was released at the end of January 2005. Two months later he joined Conference National side Farnborough Town.

He returned to Australia, joining A-League outfit Newcastle United Jets as player / Goalkeeper coach for the inaugural season in 2005 before returning to Perth to play for semi professional outfit ECU Joondalup.

References

External links

1969 births
Living people
Sportspeople from Fremantle
Association football goalkeepers
Australian soccer players
Australian expatriate soccer players
A-League Men players
Premier League players
League of Ireland players
AFC Bournemouth players
Bradford City A.F.C. players
Brighton & Hove Albion F.C. players
Charlton Athletic F.C. players
Colchester United F.C. players
Derry City F.C. players
Farnborough F.C. players
Ipswich Town F.C. players
Luton Town F.C. players
Notts County F.C. players
Plymouth Argyle F.C. players
Portsmouth F.C. players
Rushden & Diamonds F.C. players
Southend United F.C. players
Swindon Town F.C. players
Torquay United F.C. players
Walsall F.C. players
West Bromwich Albion F.C. players
Wolverhampton Wanderers F.C. players
Expatriate footballers in England
Expatriate association footballers in the Republic of Ireland